The Arab raid against Rome took place in 846. Muslim raiders plundered the outskirts of the city of Rome, sacking the basilicas of Old St Peter's and St Paul's-Outside-the-Walls, but were prevented from entering the city itself by the Aurelian Walls.

Background
In the 820s, the Aghlabids of Ifriqiya (known by medieval Italians as the Saracens) began the conquest of Sicily. In 842, Arab forces under the rule of Muhammad Abul Abbas took Messina, Sicily. Around the same time Radelchis and Siconulf, rivals engaged in civil war over the Principality of Benevento, hired Arab mercenaries.

There is disagreement among the chroniclers over the origins of the raiders who attacked Rome, although most sources describe them as Saracens. According to the Liber Pontificalis and the Chronicle of Monte Cassino, the raiders were Saracens from Africa who raided Corsica before attacking Rome. The Annals of Fulda, on the other hand, describe the raiders as Moors, which generally indicated Muslims from al-Andalus (Spain) or the Maghreb, as opposed to Ifriqiya. The author of the Annals of Xanten was unsure: he called the raiders "either Moors or else Saracens". It is possible that the annals, which are from north of the Alps, were using "Moors" as a synonym for "Saracens". No Italian source describes the raiders of 846 as Moors.

In 842 or thereabouts, according to the Deeds of the Bishops of Naples, Saracens from Sicily occupied the Pontine Islands and the isle of Licosa, but were driven off by Duke Sergius I of Naples and a coalition he had formed with Amalfi, Gaeta and Sorrento. Deprived of their island bases, these Saracens occupied the harbour of Miseno near Naples. From there they launched their attack on Rome the next year. This source can be reconciled with those which give the raiders an African origin, since the Muslims then conquering Sicily under the Aghlabids were originally from Africa.

Raid 
A large force landed at Porto and Ostia in 846, annihilating the garrison of Nova Ostia. The Arabs struck following the Tiber and the Ostiense and Portuense roads, as the Roman militia hastily retreated to the safety of the Roman walls. 

At the same time, other Arab forces landed at Centumcellae, marching towards Rome.

Some basilicas, such as St. Peter's and Saint Paul Outside the Walls, were outside the Aurelian Walls, and thus easy targets. They were "filled to overflowing with rich liturgical vessels and with jewelled reliquaries housing all of the relics recently amassed". The most important among them were the golden cross erected above the alleged tomb of Petrus, the so-called Pharum Hadriani, and the silver table donated to the church by Charlemagne, and adorned with a representation of Constantinople. As a result, the raiders pillaged the surroundings of the city and desecrated the two holy shrines. Some historians believe the raiders had known exactly where to look for the most valuable treasures.

No contemporary account hints at any attempt to penetrate the city, but it is possible that the Romans defended the walls, while around Saint Peter's, members of the Vatican scholae (Saxons, Lombards, Frisians and Franks) attempted to resist, but were defeated.

In the meantime, an army coming from Spoleto and headed by Lombard Duke Guy, attacked the Arabs, hindered by booty and prisoners, in front of the city walls, pursuing a part of them until Centumcellae, while another group tried to reach Misenum by land. The Saracens were able to embark, but a storm destroyed many ships, bringing on the beaches many corpses adorned with jewels which could be recovered. After that, the Lombard army headed south, reaching the Arabs at Gaeta, where another battle was engaged. On that occasion, only the arrival of Cesarius, son of Sergius, Magister Militum of Naples, decided the battle in favour of the Christians.

Aftermath
Shortly after the siege, Pope Leo IV built the Leonine Wall on the right bank of the Tiber, in order to protect the Church of St. Peter. The encircled territory, defended by Castel Sant'Angelo, was named Leonine City after the pope, and was considered a separate town, with its own administration. It joined the city in the sixteenth century, becoming the fourteenth rione of Rome, Borgo. In 849, another Arab raid against Rome's port, Ostia, would be repelled; The Saracen survivors were made prisoners, enslaved and sent to work in chain gangs building the Leonine Wall which was to encompass the Vatican Hill. Rome would never again be threatened by an Arab army.

See also
Early Caliphate navy
History of Islam in southern Italy
Battle of Ostia

Notes

Sources

840s conflicts
Medieval Rome
Arab–Byzantine wars
846
9th century in the Papal States
Battles involving the Aghlabids
Attacks on churches in Europe